Robert Schultz may refer to:

 Robert Schultz (figure skater) (born 1989), Canadian pair skater
 Robert Schultz (footballer) (born 1944), Australian rules footballer
 Robert Weir Schultz (1860–1951), Scottish Arts and Crafts architect, artist, landscape designer and furniture designer
 Bob Schultz (1923–1979), American  baseball player

See also
 Robert Schulz (disambiguation)